Freeman HKD Boss (born June 22, 1988), born Emegy Slyvester Chizanga, is a Zimdancehall artist who rose to prominence after release of Joina City single.

Early life 
Freeman HKD was born in Bindura, Mashonaland Central province of Zimbabwe in a family of 6. He grew up in Bindura town where he attended his early education.

Career background 

Freeman started his music career in 2009 when he recorded his first track Unondipa Rudo which was produced by WeMaNuff Nhubu. Before becoming a recording artist, he was a professional footballer playing for Mwana Africa F.C. in first division league at the time, he also spent a considerable time of his life in the late 2000s as a butcher boy in the Waterfalls area. As an underground artist, Freeman HKD  continued to record more tracks including Unondipa Rudo, Ellen, Mapatya, Mhuka Nhatu, Murondatsimba, Handichakuda and Ndoda.

In 2010, Freeman HKD met Dj Staera who introduced him to Hillary Mutake of Punchline Entertainment and there after, he started doing public performances, his first performance was at a high school in Banket in late 2010. His big break came with the release of his track Joina City, the song became a hit on radio stations in Zimbabwe. Freeman was listed as one of the 100 most influential young Zimbabweans of 2013.

In 2012 Freeman HKD established HKD Records a record label which houses numerous popular and some award winning artists including Daruler, Delroy, Vivian, Black Warrior, Crystal and Maggikal, hence he is also referred to as HKD Boss.

Discography
Freeman HKD has recorded 9 studio albums:

Albums
Tapinda Mustaera 2011
Last Man Standing 2012
Vabeliver 2013
New Chapta 2014
Varidzi Vezvinhu 2015
Mangoma Ihobho 2016
Top Stricker 2017
Mukuru WeKambani 2018
Gango 2019
Kusuka EP
Robbery 2021
David and Goliath 2022

Mixtapes
Freeman & Friends 2020

Singles
Joina City feat. Cally C 2014
Shaina 2013
Bata Ruwoko Rwangu 2014
Interview feat. Darula 2016
Ndarangarira 2016
Time To Get Rich feat. Anthony B 2017
Bhebhi Rakashata 2017
Wekwedu 2018
Imi Amai Kusuka 2018
Mbuya Nehanda feat. Nutty O 2018
Doctor weMagitare
Ngaibake 2019
Nzenza feat. Ex Q 2019
Jerusarema feat. EX-Q
Miridzo 2020
Mudzanga 2020
Ndinofirapo feat. Yadah Voices
Zi zi feat. Mai Titi 2020
iParty feat. Sandra Ndebele 2021
Pombi 2021
 What's your name 2021

Radio hits
Freeman HKD has had several hits across Zimbabwean radio stations from his breakout song Joina City in 2013. In October 2013 to December 2013, Shaina single was voted in radio charts then in 2014, his song Bata Ruwoko Rwangu was in radio top charts for eight weeks from March to early May 2014. Freeman HKD continued to have radio success with other singles over the years, in 2019 his single Ngaibake won song of the year and Nzenza was named the most played song on radio.

Other most performing tracks on radio include:

Joina City
Shaina
Bata Ruwoko Wangu
Jerusarema feat. EX-Q
Ndinofirapo feat. Yadah Voices
Kutenda feat. Mambo Dhuterere
Ngaibake
Nzenza

Awards

Zimdancehall Awards 2013, Male Artist of the year (Nomination)
Zimdancehall Awards 2014, Album the year (New Chapta)
Zimdancehall Awards 2015, Zimdancehall Ambassador
Zimdancehall Awards 2016, Zimdancehall Ambassador
Zimbabwe Achievers Awards 2016, International Music Artist of the year
Zimdancehall Awards 2017, Best Album (Top Striker), Best Stable (HKD Records)
Zimdancehall Awards 2019, Album the year (Gango), Song of the year (Ngaibake)
Zimbabwe Music Awards 2019-20, Best Music Video (Ngaibake), Best Collaboration nomination Ngaibake (feat. Alick Macheso), Best Zimdancehall Artist, Best Male Artist of the Year (Nomination), Best Album (Gango)
National Arts Merit Awards 2019, Artist of the year, Album of the year Gango, Best Music video of the  year for Ngaibake (nomination)
Star FM Music Awards 2019, People's Choice, Song of the year Ngaibake
Star FM Music Awards 2019, Most Played Song on radio Nenza
Zimdancehall Awards 2020, Best Male Artist
Zimbabwe Music Awards 2020, Best Album of the year nomination and Best Male Artist of the year nomination
Star FM Music Awards 2020, Best Album of the year (Freeman and Friends), Best Male Artist of the year nomination

Personal life

Freeman HKD is married to Barbra Chinhema since 2012.

References 
  

Living people
Zimbabwean musicians
1988 births